Vratiće se rode is a Serbian television series. Broadcast on B92 television in Serbia, it premiered on November 9, 2007. The series is directed by Goran Gajić and written by Nikola Pejaković (12 episodes) along with Ranko Božić (9 episodes) while 4 episodes were co-written between the two of them. It is produced by Cobra Films (a production company owned by the Bjelogrlić brothers) and the Adrenalin production house.

It consists of 25 episodes, each lasting 45 minutes with the exception of the introductory and the last episodes, which lasted 90 minutes. Placed in a primetime 9:00 pm slot on Fridays, the series quickly achieved high viewership; its premiere was watched by 2.6 million viewers in Serbia.

In addition to Serbia, in early 2008 Vratiće se rode was also shown on two stations in Bosnia and Herzegovina—Federalna televizija (Fridays at 8:00 pm from January 18, 2008) and RTRS (Saturdays at 8:00 pm from January 19, 2008)—as well as in Macedonia on A1 Television. Since February 4, 2008, it has also been shown in Montenegro on TV IN, which placed it in an 8.00 pm time slot on Mondays. On March 5, 2008, it premiered in Croatia on Nova TV, which originally placed it in a 9:40 pm timeslot on Wednesdays, however its time slot and day of airing was changed around frequently.

After the first season, the series had a two-part New Year's special aired on January 1 and 2, 2009, called Rode u magli (Storks in the Mist), followed by a possible second season. The two-episode special was written by Miloš Radović.

The series follows the exploits of a couple of Belgrade petty criminals nicknamed Ekser and Švaba. Each with his own set of emotional and financial issues, they look to rectify their latest problems when Švaba unexpectedly inherits a house from a deceased relative in the Banat village of Baranda.

Cast

References

External links 
 
 Mira Furlan posle 17 godina igra u srpskoj seriji, Blic, February 3, 2008

2007 Serbian television series debuts
2008 Serbian television series endings
Serbian drama television series
Serbian crime television series
2000s Serbian television series
Television shows set in Belgrade
Television shows set in Serbia
Works about the Serbian Mafia
Television shows filmed in Belgrade
Works about organized crime in Serbia
Vojvodina in fiction
B92 original programming